Two Marriages is an American dramatic television series that aired on ABC from August 23, 1983, until April 26, 1984.

Premise
The Armstrongs and Daleys, two married couples with very different marriages but a close friendship live next-door to each other in suburban Iowa (ostensibly the Des Moines, Iowa metropolitan area, but it wasn't ever established as such).

Nancy Armstrong is a traditional homemaker whose husband, Art, is a successful, earnest, but occasionally distant and cynical surgeon; their teenage daughter Shelby is wise beyond her years and yet feels awkward, while their mischievous son Eric is about to enter puberty.

Ann Daley, transplanted from Chicago, is a professional engineer whose husband (her second), Jim, is a down-to-earth dairy farmer; their children include her troubled son Scott Morgan, from her previous broken marriage, who resented the move to Iowa and wanted to return to Chicago, due to his feeling left out in the new family dynamics; Jim's adopted Vietnamese daughter, Kim, and the young son Willie they had together.

Willie and Kim bonded although they weren't blood, and eventually Scott found himself becoming part of the family, thanks to his neighbor, Shelby, who was able to get through to him.

Jim Daley's fun-loving, hard-working father, Woody, who operates the dairy with him, is an active figure in the lives of his actual and adopted grandchildren.

Cast
Michael Murphy as Dr. Art Armstrong
Tom Mason as Tom Daley
Karen Carlson as Ann Daley
Janet Eilber as Nancy Armstrong
Ina Fried as Willie Daley
Tiffany Toyoshima as Kim Daley
C. Thomas Howell as Scott Morgan
Kirk Cameron as Eric Armstrong
Louanne as Shelby Armstrong
John McLiam as Woody Daley

US television ratings

Episodes
Pilot
Relativity
Episode 103
Episode 104
Episode 105
Episode 106
Episode 107
Episode 108
Episode 109
Episode 110

References

External links
 
TV Guide

1983 American television series debuts
1984 American television series endings
1980s American drama television series
English-language television shows
American Broadcasting Company original programming
Television shows set in Iowa
Television series by Warner Bros. Television Studios
Television series by Lorimar Television